Scrimmage (alteration of skirmish) may refer to:

 An exhibition game, an informal sports contest or practice match which does not go on the regular season record
 Line of scrimmage, in American football and related games
 Scrimmage vest, clothing used in practices as a substitute for a sports uniform
 USS Scrimmage (AM-297), a U.S. Navy minesweeper built during World War II
 Scholastic Scrimmage, a high school quiz bowl game show televised in Pennsylvania, US

See also
 Scrum (rugby)
 Scrim (disambiguation)